Mohammed Al-Sumaiti (Arabic:محمد السميطي) (born 30 March 1995) is an Emirati footballer. He played in the Arabian Gulf League for Al-Wasl.

External links

References

Emirati footballers
1995 births
Living people
Al-Wasl F.C. players
UAE Pro League players
Association football defenders